KEBF-LP is a low power radio station broadcasting a community radio format out of Morro Bay, California.

History
KEBF-LP began broadcasting on April 8, 2014.

Estero Bay Community Radio, AKA 97.3 The Rock, is a  501(c)(3) non-profit organization started by radio veteran Hal Abrams in December 2011. KEBF became licensed in March 2014, hitting the air in April 2014. The Rock is operated and supported by listeners and residents of Morro Bay, Los Osos and Cayucos, California. An all volunteer staff of 53 air-talents delivers diverse programming 24 hours a day at 97.3 FM in Morro Bay and KZSR-LP 107.9 FM in Paso Robles, and online at EsteroBayRadio.org. The station, originally licensed to the City of Morro Bay, is now licensed to Estero Bay Community Radio. The purchase price was $1.00.

References

External links
 

2014 establishments in California
Mass media in San Luis Obispo County, California
EBF-LP
EBF-LP
Radio stations established in 2014
Community radio stations in the United States